was a Japanese samurai of the early Sengoku period, who served the Hosokawa clan. Motokazu was a retainer of Hosokawa Masamoto and deputy governor of Settsu Province. In the Autumn of 1504 he rebelled against Masamoto and marched to Kyoto but his rebellion was defeated seventeen days later when Masamoto's forces took his castle of Yodo. Motokazu was captured and committed seppuku.

References 

Daimyo
1475 births
1504 deaths
Suicides by seppuku
16th-century suicides